One Love is the fourth studio album by French DJ David Guetta, first released in the United Kingdom on 24 August 2009 through Virgin Records. Guetta's first major international release, the album received generally favourable reviews from music critics, and was a commercial success, selling over 3 million copies globally. It spawned a total of six worldwide hit singles throughout 2009 and 2010, most notably "When Love Takes Over", featuring American recording artist Kelly Rowland, "Sexy Bitch", featuring Senegalese-American R&B singer Akon, and "Who's That Chick?", featuring Barbadian recording artist Rihanna and "One Love", featuring British recording artist Estelle. One Love is also Guetta's last studio album to feature his long-time collaborator, Chris Willis, on vocals. Since the album's initial release, it has since been reissued several times to include previously unreleased tracks and other bonus material.

The album received a nomination for the 52nd Grammy Awards in the category Best Electronic/Dance Album. The album's lead single, "When Love Takes Over" was nominated in the categories Best Dance Recording and Best Remixed Recording, Non-Classical, and won the latter.

Critical reception

One Love received generally favourable reviews from most music critics. According to Metacritic, which assigns a normalized rating out of 100 to reviews from mainstream critics, the album received an average score of 66, based on ten reviews, which indicates "generally favorable reviews". Entertainment website Digital Spy gave the album a very positive review and rewarded it four out of five stars. The Los Angeles Times gave the album 3/5, saying "Guetta is at his best (and his most commercial) when he's equipped with a melody as chewy as his beats." Ginger Clemens of Billboard calls it an effortless integration off catchy dance beats with expressive vocals, turning out Top 40-friendly songs while remaining true to dance club culture. AllMusic: Even if everything seems built for the 12" format and then landed on an album anyway, Guetta's fans get all the well-done house music they desire, and then some. musicOMH: He can doubtless get a party started every bit as effectively as either of those two [Paul van Dyk & Diplo] but, on this record at least, in dance terms he finds himself rather falling between two stools as he enlarges the walls of his big tent. Caroline Sullivan of The Guardian gave One Love 3 out of 5 stars calling many of the songs enjoyable while favoring "Estelle's tender performance of the title track deserves special mention" and mentioning that "It feels like a series of tracks rather than a fully realised long-player." NOW Magazine calls "One Love" surprisingly deep. Observer Music Monthly calls it "the sound of the summer! If summer for you means a fake tan and drinking WKD for a week in the Med with the likes of Kelly Rowland and Will.i.am popping up as guests with your fave."

Singles
"When Love Takes Over" was released as the first single and featured Kelly Rowland. The song was a worldwide hit and peaked at number one in the UK and won the Best Remixed Recording, Non-Classical Grammy Award, selling over 5.5 million copies worldwide. "Sexy Bitch" was the second single from the album and featured Akon. The song has become a worldwide hit, reaching the top spot on thirteen different charts. It peaked at number one in the UK as well as many other countries. "I Wanna Go Crazy" was the album's only promotional single, released on 24 August 2009. "One Love" was released as the third worldwide single from the album and featured Estelle. It topped the US Billboard Hot Dance Club Songs chart. "Memories" was released as the fourth single on 15 March 2010 and features Kid Cudi. The song peaked at number one in Belgium, Czech Republic and Netherlands.

The extended version of the song "How Soon Is Now" (with Sebastian Ingrosso and Dirty South, featuring Julie McKnight) was a single released exclusively on Beatport on 12 August 2009 through Guetta's own label, F*** Me I'm Famous Records (a subdivision of Gum Productions). The song has reached number 52 on the Swedish charts.

One More Love singles

"Gettin' Over You", is the lead single from One More Love with vocals of Chris Willis, Fergie and LMFAO. It topped the charts in the United Kingdom and France.

"Who's That Chick?" is the second single from One More Love. It features Rihanna. The song's music video was used as part of a promotional ad campaign for Doritos. Two music videos were created, a day and a night one. They were released on 22 November 2010.

Track listing
All songs written and produced by David Guetta. Additional producers and lyricists listed.

One Love

One More Love

Charts

Weekly charts

Year-end charts

Certifications and sales

Release history
Standard edition

One More Love

References

External links
 One Love at Metacritic

2009 albums
David Guetta albums
Virgin Records albums
Albums produced by David Guetta